T. V. Rajesh (born 11 January 1974) is an Indian politician from the state of Kerala, and a former member of the Legislative Assembly of Kerala. He represented the Kalliasseri constituency of Kerala and is a member of the Communist Party of India (Marxist) (CPI(M)). Rajesh was the president of the DYFI Kerala state committee, and also a state committee member of the CPI(M).

Early life
T. V. Rajesh was born to Chandukutty and Madhavi at Kulapuram, Kannur district. He did his schooling in Cheruthazham High School and subsequently completed his pre-degree and bachelor's degree in Political Science from Payyanur College, Kannur. He completed his master's degree in law from Government Law College, Thiruvananthapuram.

Political career
T. V. Rajesh entered into politics as a Students' Federation of India (SFI) activist. Later he moved onto Democratic Youth Federation of India and actively took part in various strikes and movements. He was the president of the DYFI Kerala state committee. 
His political activism saw him lead student struggles right from his days as a high school student. He has been part of many different struggles against various United Democratic Front governments in Kerala. His struggles have been brutally repressed in the past, which made him spend 87 days behind the bars.

He was elected as the state secretary of SFI in 2002 and as the National Joint Secretary in 2003. He was elected as the member of the Legislative Assembly of Kerala from his constituency in May 2011 with a margin of nearly 30,000 votes. In 2012 Kerala state conference of CPI(M), he was elected as a member of the state committee of the party. He was re-elected from the same constituency in 2016 with a margin of more than 42,000 votes.

2016 Kalliasseri election results

There were 1,77,121 registered voters in the constituency for the 2016 election.

2011 Kalliasseri election results
There were 1,57,384 registered voters in the constituency for the 2011 election.

Positions held
 SFI Cheruthazham unit secretary in 1996
 SFI Madayi area president in 1998
 SFI Kannur district president in 1999
 Calicut University union counselor in 2000
 SFI Kannur district secretary in 2000
 SFI Kerala state secretary in 2002
 Calicut University senate member
 DYFI Kannur district president in 2006
 DYFI Kerala state joint secretary in 2006
 DYFI Kerala state secretary in 2007
 CPI(M) Kannur district committee member in 2007
 Member of Kerala Legislative Assembly in 2011
 CPI(M) Kerala State committee member in 2012

References

External links

1974 births
Living people
Communist Party of India (Marxist) politicians from Kerala
Politicians from Kannur
Kerala MLAs 2011–2016
Kerala MLAs 2016–2021
Government Law College, Thiruvananthapuram alumni